Pharmaceutical Biology is a monthly peer-reviewed medical journal that publishes research on natural product research related to pharmaceutical biology. The editor-in-chief is John M. Pezzuto (Western New England University).

External links 
 

Publications established in 1961
Pharmacology journals
Monthly journals
Taylor & Francis academic journals
English-language journals